The Alzou is a short river in the Lot département, southern France, a right tributary of the Ouysse. It flows through the towns Gramat and Rocamadour, and joins the Ouysse, itself a left tributary of the Dordogne, downstream of Rocamadour. The valleys of both the Alzou and the Ouysse are deep limestone canyons.

The river once powered the watermill moulin du Saut, whose ruins can be visited on foot.

References

Rivers of France
Rivers of Lot (department)
Rivers of Occitania (administrative region)